Amnisiophis amoena  is a species of snake of the family Colubridae.

Distribution 
The species is endemic to Brazil.

References

Dipsadinae
Endemic fauna of Brazil
Reptiles of Brazil
Reptiles described in 1863
Taxa named by Giorgio Jan